Amsterdam University Press (AUP) is a university press that was founded in 1992 by the University of Amsterdam in the Netherlands. It is based on the Anglo-Saxon university press model and operates on a not-for-profit basis. AUP publishes scholarly and trade titles in both Dutch and English, predominantly in the humanities and social sciences and has a publishing list of over 1400 titles. It also publishes multiple scholarly journals according to the open access publishing model. From 2000 until 2013, the AUP published the journal Academische Boekengids (Academic Book Guide) with book reviews written by editors from multiple Dutch universities.

Objectives
AUP makes use of the peer reviewing system: submissions are assessed by an editorial board of expert scholars from Dutch and Flemish universities. AUP explicitly supports open access, and combines in its publishing policy the use of repositories and print-on-demand provisions with traditional printing. AUP is one of thirteen publishers to participate in the Knowledge Unlatched pilot, a global library consortium approach to funding open access books.

Areas of publishing
AUP's stocklist currently comprises different academic disciplines, including language and literature, archaeology, management studies, cultural studies, film and media, art and art history, music and theatre studies, as well as social sciences, ranging from migration and integration to Asian studies. In addition, AUP is active in educational publishing for high school and higher education, as well as popular science.

Imprints
Various imprints are linked to AUP. Vossiuspers UvA publishes the works of the University of Amsterdam’s scholars and all inaugural lectures of UvA professors. In 2004, under the name Pallas Publications, AUP began a new service allowing authors, institutions, and organizations to have their academic publications produced, distributed, and promoted.

References

External links
 

University of Amsterdam
Publishing companies established in 1992
University presses of the Netherlands
Creative Commons books publishing companies
Dutch companies established in 1992
Non-profit academic publishers